Dae Jung-sang (?–698?), also known as Geolgeol Jungsang, was a key contributor to the founding of Balhae, and the father of Dae Jo-yeong, the actual founder of Balhae. Though much of the credit for the founding of Balhae went to his son, many historians still give credit to Dae Jung-sang as the main supporter and leader in the founding of Balhae.

Background 
Historical sources give different accounts of the ethnicity and background of Dae Jung-sang's son, Dae Joyeong. Among the official dynastic history works, the New Book of Tang refers to Dae Joyeong and his state as Sumo Mohe (related to Jurchens and later Manchus) affiliated with Goguryeo. The Old Book of Tang also states Dae's ethnic background as Mohe but adds that he was "高麗別種" (gaoli biezhong). The term is interpreted as meaning "a branch of the Goguryeo people" by South and North Korean historians, but as "distinct from Goguryeo" by Japanese and Chinese researchers. The Samguk yusa, a 13th-century collection of Korean history and legends, describes Dae as a Sumo Mohe leader. However, it gives another account of Dae being a former Goguryeo general, citing a now-lost Sillan record. Alexander Kim considers this unlikely since Goguryeo fell in 668 while Dae died in 719, and young men could not receive the rank of general.

Biography 
In 696, the Khitan led a revolt that killed the cruel governor of the protectorate and gave Yingzhou back to the Khitan. Dae Jung-sang allied with the Baishan Mohe leader Geolsa Biu (Hangul: 걸사비우, Hanja: 乞四比羽 pinyin: Qǐsì bǐyǔ), and the two powers opposed the Tang influence in 698. The two leaders resisted the Tang's attack, but were forced to retreat. Both Geolsa Biu, and Dae Jung-sang died in battle, but Dae Jo-yeong led the remaining Goguryeo and Malgal soldiers and defeated the Tang army at the Battle of Tianmenling (Cheonmunryeong) and established the Balhae. The state was created by the leader of the Mohe people, who subjugated the neighboring tribes both by diplomatic and military force. The people of Goguryeo were subject to diplomatic power and voluntarily recognized him as their leader.  

According to New Book of Tang, Wu Zetian created Dae as Duke of Zhen (Jin), Geolsa Biu as Duke of Xu (Heo), and pardon their crimes. Geolsa Biu refused the title and Wu sent general Li Kaigu to suppress the rebellions. Geolsa died in Battle of Tianmenling, Dae Jo-yeong led the others in victorious against Li.  Dae Jung-sang died from sickness after the battle.

Family 
The most notable and famous of his children was his eldest, Dae Jo-yeong. Dae Jung-sang had another son, Dae Ya-bal (대야발), and probably also had other children besides Dae Jo-yeong because the Balhae Royal line consisted of two lineages, one from Dae Jo-yeong and the other from Dae Ya-bal.

In popular culture
 Portrayed by Im Hyuk in the 2006-2007 KBS TV series Dae Jo Yeong.

See also
History of Manchuria
History of Korea
Dae Joyeong
Balhae

References

Bibliography

External links 

Relationship between Mohe, Jurchens and Hungarian names (Qiqi Zhongxiang and Qisi Piyu)

Balhae rulers
Balhae people
Mohe peoples
7th-century monarchs in Asia